BREC Memorial Stadium is a 21,500-seat American football stadium in Baton Rouge, Louisiana that opened in 1952.  Besides high school football, it is also used for concerts and other outdoor events, including monster truck rallies, and used for water skiing events (during the 1960s and 1970s). It features a modern press box, concession stands and restrooms. The Grantland Rice Bowl was played at the stadium from 1969 to 1973.

The stadium was dedicated by BREC, the parks and recreation commission for East Baton Rouge Parish, in memory of the men and women who fought and served Baton Rouge during the two World Wars and the Korean War.

See also
 List of music venues
 Louisiana High School Athletic Association

References

Further reading

External links
 Official website

American football venues in Baton Rouge, Louisiana
Grantland Rice Bowl
High school football venues in the United States
High school football venues in Louisiana
Music venues in Louisiana
Tourist attractions in Baton Rouge, Louisiana
1952 establishments in Louisiana
Sports venues completed in 1952